Thiruvalluvar University is a public state university in the city of Vellore, Tamil Nadu, India. It was established by the Government of Tamil Nadu, under the Thiruvalluvar University Act, 2002 (Tamil Nadu Act 32 of 2002). The university was named after the Tamil poet and sage Thiruvalluvar. 

It began functioning as the 'Post Graduate Extension Centre of University of Madras', at the Fort Campus, Vellore. After bifurcation from the University of Madras, Thiruvalluvar University moved to a new campus at Serkadu, Vellore. The university affiliates Arts and Science colleges under the area comprising the districts of Ranipet, Tirupattur, Tiruvannamalai, Vellore.

Campus
University campus is spread over an area of 112 acres at Serkadu about 16 km from the Vellore city on NH-4. The campus was inaugurated by Dr. Karunanidhi on 27 November 2010. It was constructed at a cost of Rs.20.35 crores.

The campus has an administrative block, academic and computer science blocks, and a library.

Administration
 Chancellor      : R.N.Ravi, Governor of Tamil Nadu
 Pro-Chancellor  : K. Ponmudi, Minister for Higher Education of Tamil Nadu
 Vice-Chancellor : Prof.Dr.T.Arumugam

Departments
University has following departments which offer several courses.
 Department of Economics
 Department of Zoology
 Department of Chemistry
 Department of Biotechnology
 Department of Mathematics
 Department of Tamil
 Department of English
 Department of Computer Science
 Department of Physics
 Department of Commerce

Course offered
Courses offered at the university are

Biotechnology

M.Sc. (Biotechnology)
Ph.D. (Biotechnology)

Chemistry

M.Sc. (Chemistry)
Ph.D (Chemistry)

Zoology

M.Sc. (Zoology)
Ph.D. (Zoology)

Mathematics

M.Sc. (Mathematics)
Ph.D. (Mathematics)

Economics

M.A. (Economics)
Ph.D.(Economics)

Tamil
M.A. (Tamil)
Ph.D (Tamil)

English

M.A. (English)
Ph.D.(English)

Computer Science

M.Sc. (C,S)
Ph.D (C.S)

References 

 
Memorials to Valluvar
Universities in Tamil Nadu
Universities and colleges in Vellore district
Education in Vellore
Educational institutions established in 2002
2002 establishments in Tamil Nadu